Foreign relations of Australia are influenced by its position as a leading trading nation and as a significant donor of humanitarian aid. Australia's foreign policy is guided by a commitment to multilateralism and regionalism, as well as to build strong bilateral relations with its allies. Key concerns include free trade, terrorism, refugees, economic co-operation with Asia and stability in the Indo-Pacific. Australia is active in the United Nations and the Commonwealth of Nations. Given its history of starting and supporting important regional and global initiatives, it has been described as a regional middle power par excellence.

It maintains significant ties with ASEAN and has become steadfastly allied with New Zealand, through long-standing ties dating back to the 1800s. The country also has a longstanding alliance with the United States of America. Over recent decades Australia has sought to strengthen its relationship with Asian countries, with this becoming the focus of the country's network of diplomatic missions. In 2021, Australia signed a significant security treaty with the United Kingdom and the United States of America (AUKUS) aimed at countering the growing threat of China in the region.

History

Before the Second World War, Australia saw its economic and military security assured by being a loyal dominion of the British Empire and generally sought to align its diplomatic policies with those of the British Government. Although Australia, like other British Dominions, was a signatory to the Treaty of Versailles and a member of the League of Nations, the British Government handled most of Australia's diplomatic exchanges outside the Empire. The approach of the Second World War saw the first steps by Australia in establishing its own diplomatic network, particularly with economically and politically important countries of the Pacific Rim.   The first accredited diplomat sent to a foreign country was Richard Casey, appointed as the first Minister to the United States in January 1940. This was followed shortly after by the arrival of the first Australian high commissioner to Canada, and by appointments of Ministers to Japan in 1940 and China in 1941.  With the entry of Japan into the war in December 1941 and the consequent heightened vulnerability of Australia to attack, a critical decision was made by the Curtin Government to more closely seek the military protection of the United States. Since that time, United States has been the most important security ally. The close security relationship with the United States was formalized in 1951 by the Australia, New Zealand, United States Security (ANZUS) Treaty which remains the cornerstone of Australian security arrangements.

During and after the Second World War, and in parallel with the evolution of the British Empire to the Commonwealth of Nations, Australia progressively took responsibility for fully managing its foreign relations with other states.  Australia concluded an agreement in 1944 with New Zealand dealing with the security, welfare, and advancement of the people of the dependent territories of the Pacific (the ANZAC pact).  Australia was one of the founders of the United Nations (1945) and the South Pacific Commission (1947), and in 1950, it proposed the Colombo Plan to assist developing countries in Asia.  After the war, Australia played a role in the Far Eastern Commission in Japan and supported Indonesian independence during that country's revolt against the Dutch (1945–49).

As the Cold War deepened, Australia aligned itself fully with the Western Powers.  In addition to contributing to UN forces in the Korean War – it was the first country to announce it would do so after the United States – Australia sent troops to assist in putting down the communist revolt in Malaya in 1948–60 and later to combat the Indonesian-supported invasion of Sarawak in 1963–65.  Australia sent troops to repel communism and assist South Vietnamese and American forces in the Vietnam War, in a move that stirred up antiwar activism at home.  Australia has been active in the Five Eyes intelligence alliance, and in the Australia – New Zealand – United Kingdom agreement and the Five Power Defence Arrangement—successive arrangements with Britain and New Zealand to ensure the security of Singapore and Malaysia.

After the end of the Cold War, Australia remained an important contributor to UN peacekeeping missions and to other multilateral security missions, often in alliance with the United States.  Notably, it joined coalition forces in the Persian Gulf War in 1991, the War in Afghanistan (2001-2021), the Iraq War of 2003-2011 and the War in Iraq (2013-2017).  In 1999 Australian peace keeping forces intervened in East Timor following its referendum to secede from Indonesia. In 2006 Australia sent a contingent of Australian troops to the state to assist in the 2006 East Timor crisis.  Australia has also most recently led security assistance, peacekeeping and policing missions elsewhere in its neighbourhood, including in the Solomon Islands, Papua New Guinea and Tonga.

In the late 20th Century and early 21st Century, a new element in Australia's foreign relations was the growing relationship with the People's Republic of China.  After the establishment of diplomatic relations in December 1972, Sino-Australian relations grew rapidly, to a point where China became Australia's main trading partner and extensive official and people-to-people links were well established.  In the first 15 years of the 21st Century, Australia maintained privileged relations with both the United States and China.  Since 2017, Sino-Australian relations have deteriorated dramatically, as a result of Australian criticism of policies and actions taken under General Secretary of the Chinese Communist Party Xi Jinping.  This has strongly influenced recent Australian bilateral and multi-lateral engagements such as the Pacific Step-Up with Pacific Island states, the development of comprehensive strategic partnerships with a number of regional states, and the pursuit of alliances directed at countering Chinese predominance in the Indo-Pacific region.  Since 2017, existing security arrangements have been augmented by a revived Quadrilateral Security Dialogue involving India, Japan and United States, the 2021 AUKUS security pact with the United States and United Kingdom and the 2022 Australia-Japan Reciprocal Access Agreement, which provides for closer Australian-Japanese cooperation on defense and humanitarian operations.

International agencies, treaties, and agreements

Membership of International Organizations and Groupings 

One of the drafters of the UN Charter, Australia has given firm support to the United Nations system. Australia held the first Presidency of the Security Council in 1946 and provided the first military observers under UN auspices a year later, to Indonesia. It has been a member of the Security Council a further four times, in 1956–57, 1973–74, 1986–87 and 2013–14.  It has been regularly elected a member of the Economic and Social Council most recently for 2020–22, a member of the United Nations Human Rights Council in 2018-20 and its predecessor the UN Commission on Human Rights in the 1990s. Australia takes a prominent part in many other UN activities, including peacekeeping, disarmament negotiations, and narcotics control.  In September 1999, acting under a UN Security Council mandate, Australia led an international coalition to restore order in East Timor upon Indonesia's withdrawal from that territory.  Australia has also been closely engaged in international development cooperation and humanitarian assistance through the Specialized agencies, Funds and Programmes and Regional Commissions of the United Nations and major International Financial Institutions, in particular the World Bank, the International Monetary Fund, the Asian Development Bank and the Asian Infrastructure Investment Bank.

Australia is a member of the G20, the Organisation for Economic Co-operation and Development (OECD), and the APEC forum.  It is active in meetings of the Commonwealth Heads of Government, the Pacific Islands Forum and other Pacific Islands regional organizations and the Indian Ocean Rim Association.  It has been a leader in the Cairns Group – countries pressing for agricultural trade reform in the Uruguay Round of the General Agreement on Tariffs and Trade (GATT) negotiations. Australia is also a member of MIKTA,  an informal and diverse middle power partnership between Mexico, Indonesia, South Korea, Turkey and Australia, led by its foreign ministers, which seeks to promote an effective, rules-based global order.

Australia has devoted particular attention in the early 21st century to promoting regional architecture centered around the countries of the Association of Southeast Asian Nations (ASEAN), to support dialogue on political, security and economic challenges in the Indo-Pacific region. Australia is an active participant in the ASEAN Regional Forum (ARF), and the ASEAN sponsored East Asia Summit. Australia's place at the 2005 inaugural summit was only secured after it agreed to reverse its policy and accede to ASEAN's Treaty of Amity and Cooperation in Southeast Asia. Australia had been reluctant to sign the treaty out of concerns regarding how it would affect Australia's obligation under other treaty arrangements including ANZUS.

Security treaties

Special Strategic Partnership 
Japan (as of 2014)

Comprehensive Strategic Partnership 
Australia has a formal Comprehensive Strategic Partnership with the following countries and multi-national organizations.
India (as of 2020)
Singapore (as of 2016)
Indonesia (as of 2018)
Malaysia (as of 2021)
South Korea (as of 2021)
ASEAN (as of 2021)

Trade

Overall Australia's largest trading partners are the United States, South Korea, Japan, China, and the United Kingdom. Australia currently has bilateral Free Trade Agreements with New Zealand, the United States, Thailand and Singapore as of 2007 and the United Kingdom as of 2021. As well as this, Australia is in the process undertaking studies on Free Trade Agreements with ASEAN, China, Chile, India, Indonesia, and Malaysia.
 Australia–Chile Free Trade Agreement
 Australia–China Free Trade Agreement
 Australia–Korea Free Trade Agreement
 Australia–New Zealand Closer Economic Relations Trade Agreement
 Australia–United States Free Trade Agreement
 Australia–United Kingdom Free Trade Agreement
 Australia–Fiji Free Trade Agreement

Armaments

To bolster its foreign policy, Australia maintains a very well-equipped military,
According to SIPRI, Australia is the fourth largest importer of major weapons in the world. The US supplied 60 per cent of Australia's imports and Spain 29 per cent. All armed services have received new major arms in 2014–18, but mainly aircraft and ships. The F-35 combat aircraft and antisubmarine warfare aircraft from the USA made up 53 per cent of Australian arms imports in 2014–18, while ships from Spain accounted for 29 per cent. Large deliveries for additional aircraft and ships are outstanding.

Australia is modernising its armed forces but also acquiring weapons that significantly increase its long-range capabilities. Among the weapons imported in 2010–14 were 5 tanker aircraft and the first of 2 amphibious assault ships from Spain, along with 2 large transport aircraft and 4 airborne early warning (AEW) aircraft from the USA. Australia also received 26 combat aircraft from the US, with 82 more on order (see box 3), as well as 8 anti-submarine warfare aircraft from the US and 3 Hobart destroyers from Spain.  Australia's imports of major weapons increased 37 percent between 2010 and 2014 and 2014–18, making it the fourth largest importer in the world according to SIPRI.

In 2021, after Australia ended its 20-year military mission in Afghanistan, the defence officials held formal talks on strengthening military ties with the United Arab Emirates. However, the human rights groups said that it was "very concerning" to witness, as the Emirates was accused of carrying out "unlawful attacks" in war-torn nations like Libya and Yemen.

In December 2021, Australia signed a defence procurement deal with South Korea worth $1billion AUD (US$720 million) for modern artillery, supply trucks and radars supplied by South Korean defense company Hanwha. The South Korean President Moon Jae-in and Australian Prime Minister Scott Morrison met for the signing of the agreement and additionally announced they were formally upgrading the Australian-South Korean relationship to a "comprehensive strategic partnership."

Foreign missions

Australia has diplomatic missions in over 110 locations in the form of embassies, high commissions and consulates.   As of 2011, Australia had established formal diplomatic relations with all members of the United Nations as well as the Holy See, Kosovo, Cook Islands and (in 2013) Niue. In many cases, diplomatic relations are maintained on a non-resident basis, with the Australian ambassador or high commissioner based in another country. Since 2012, diplomatic relations have been effectively suspended with the Syrian Arab Republic, with no diplomatic accreditation by either country maintained, but consular relations continue. In the case of Afghanistan, following the Taliban takeover in 2021, diplomatic relations are in an ambiguous status with Australia "temporarily" closing its embassy in Kabul and not recognizing the Islamic Emirate government but maintaining the credentials of the embassy of the Islamic Republic of Afghanistan in Canberra. A number of Canadian missions provide consular assistance to Australians in countries in Africa where Australia does not maintain an office (and Australia reciprocates this arrangement for Canada in some other countries) through the Canada-Australia Consular Services Sharing Agreement.

Due to the One China Policy of the People's Republic of China, the Australian Office in Taiwan (formerly the Australian Commerce and Industry Office) unofficially represents Australia's interest in Taiwan, serving a function similar to other Australian Consulates.

Bilateral relations

Africa

Americas

Asia

Europe

Oceania

Australia is a member of the Pacific Islands Forum and other regional organisations. As part of its Pacific Step-Up initiative announced in 2016 Australia has uniquely established resident High Commissions and embassies in all independent and self governing members of the Pacific Islands Forum as well as consulates-general in New Caledonia and French Polynesia. Australia provides aid to many of its developing Pacific Islands neighbours, and to Papua New Guinea. For decades, it has been the largest donor of aid to the Oceania region. China and New Zealand, the next biggest donors, donated only one sixth of Australia's aid during the 2010s.

Since the end of the Cold War, the understanding from the United States has been that Australia and New Zealand would assume responsibility for the security of much of the Oceania region, whom they already share pre-existing cultural and economic ties to.

Australia's approach to the Pacific has included frequent references to what it has perceived as an "Arc of Instability" among its island neighbours. In August 2006 Australian Defence Minister Brendan Nelson stated to the Australian Parliament:

We cannot afford to have failing states in our region. The so-called 'arc of instability', which basically goes from East Timor through to the south-west Pacific states, means that not only does Australia have a responsibility in preventing and indeed assisting with humanitarian and disaster relief, but also that we cannot allow any of these countries to become havens for transnational crime, nor indeed havens for terrorism.

As from early 2008, the Australian government led by Kevin Rudd began what it called a "new approach" to relations between Australia and the Pacific, appointing a Parliamentary Secretary for Pacific Island Affairs, Duncan Kerr. In February, Kerr and fellow Parliamentary Secretary for Foreign Affairs, Bob McMullan visited Samoa, Tonga and Kiribati in February, and stated:

Broadly, the approach is one of much more partnership and engagement on the basis of mutual respect. We're not going to be lecturing or hectoring, we're going to try and work together with them and I think we set a pretty good standard with the way we started. The relationships we've established with ministers and leaders in those countries [Kiribati, Tonga and Samoa] is very positive.

Richard Marles, the deputy leader of the Australian Labor Party, has strongly advocated for Australia to prioritize its role in the Pacific. In 2021, he wrote a book titled Tides that bind: Australia in the Pacific, and claimed in an interview that, "By any measure, we are huge part of the Pacific. We're the largest donor into the Pacific, we’ve got the biggest diplomatic footprint in the Pacific, we’ve got the most development resources in the Pacific of any country. For most of the Pacific, we're the most important bilateral relationship they have, more important than the United States, more important than China."

Public opinion

Democracy

See also
 ANZUS
 AUKUS
 Australia and the United Nations
 Australia House (Ottawa)
 Australian contribution to the 2003 Gulf War
 CANZUK International and CANZUK
 Defence of Australia Policy
 Five Eyes
 Free-trade area
 List of Australians imprisoned or executed abroad
 List of diplomatic missions in Australia
 List of diplomatic missions of Australia
 Market access
 Quadrilateral Security Dialogue
 Rules of Origin
 Tariffs
 UKUSA Agreement
 Visa requirements for Australian citizens

References

 
 2003 US Department of State website

Further reading
 Abbondanza, Gabriele. The Geopolitics of Australia in the New Millennium: the Asia-Pacific Context (Aracne, 2013)
 Beeson, Mark. "Issues in Australian Foreign Policy". The Australian Journal of Politics and History (2002) 48#2 online
 Bisley, Nick. "Issues in Australian Foreign Policy: July to December 2011". Australian Journal of Politics & History  (2012) 58#2 pp 268–82 
 Chai, Tommy Sheng Hao. "How China attempts to drive a wedge in the U.S.-Australia alliance". Australian Journal of International Affairs 74.5 (2020): 511–531.
 Chieocharnpraphan, Thosaphon. Australian Foreign Policy under the Howard Government: Australia as a Middle Power? (2011)
 Curley, Melissa, and Dane Moores. "Issues in Australian Foreign Policy, January to June 2011". Australian Journal of Politics & History  (2011) 57#4 pp 597–613 
 Dalrymple, Rawdon. Continental Drift: Australia's Search for a Regional Identity (Aldershot, England: Ashgate, 2003). .
 Fels, Enrico. Shifting Power in Asia-Pacific? The Rise of China, Sino-US Competition and Regional Middle Power Allegiance. (Springer, 2017), pp. 365–436.
 Firth, Stewart. Australia in International Politics: An Introduction to Australian Foreign Policy (3rd ed., 2011) online 2005 edition
 Gyngell; Allan, and Michael Wesley.  Making Australian Foreign Policy (Cambridge University Press, 2003) online
 Hundt, David. "Issues in Australian Foreign Policy: July to December 2010". Australian Journal of Politics & History (2011) 
 Lockyer, Adam, Australia's Defence Strategy: Evaluating Alternatives for a Contested Asia, (Melbourne: Melbourne University Press, 2017)
 McDonald, Scott D., and Andrew T. H. Tan, eds. The Future of the United States-Australia Alliance: Evolving Security Strategy in the Indo-Pacific (2020)  excerpt
 Millar, T. B. Australia in peace and war: external relations 1788-1977 (1978) online, 612pp
 Patience, Allan. Australian Foreign Policy in Asia: Middle Power or Awkward Partner? (2019) excerpt 
 Suri, Navdeep. "Australia-China Relations: The Great Unravelling". ORF Issue Brief No. 366, June 2020, Observer Research Foundation. online
 Tow, William T., and Chen-shen Yen. "Australia–Taiwan relations: the evolving geopolitical setting". Australian Journal of International Affairs 61.3 (2007): 330–350.
 Ungerer, Carl. "The 'middle power' concept in Australian foreign policy". Australian Journal of Politics & History 53.4 (2007): 538–551.
 Watt, Alan. The Evolution of Australian Foreign Policy 1938–1965. (Cambridge UP, 1967)

External links
 Australian Department of Foreign Affairs
 Australian Customs Service
 Australian Embassies, high commissions, consulates, multilateral missions and representative offices
 Index of Foreign Embassies in Australia

 
Australia and the Commonwealth of Nations
Politics of Australia